The 2010 season is New Radiant Sports Club's 31st year in existence as a football club.

Background 
New Radiant finished at the 4th position of last year's Dhivehi League, FA Cup and President's Cup.

Kit 
Supplier: / Sponsor: Nescafé

New Radiant started the new season without a shirt sponsor but signed a deal worth MVR 300,000 with Nescafé on 7 April 2010.

Competitions

Overall

Competition record

Dhivehi League

Matches

FA Cup

President's Cup

References 

 2010 in Maldivian football at RSSSF

New Radiant S.C. seasons